New England Roses are an American band formed in 2002 by JD Samson from Le Tigre, Sarah Gertrude Shapiro co-creator of UnREAL and Brendan Fowler from BARR who met while studying at Sarah Lawrence College.

Their music takes on aspects of Lo-Fi pop and electronica. The involvement of band members in other groups means that their songs have been written in their spare time. They have also covered tracks by George Michael, Tracy Chapman, and Dave Matthews.

Releases
7" (2005)
Face Time With Son (2005)

See also
Le Tigre

References

External links
New England Roses on MySpace
Doggpony Records

American indie rock groups